Samuel Vila Barata (born 19 July 1993) is a Portuguese long-distance runner. In 2020, he competed in the men's race at the World Athletics Half Marathon Championships held in Gdynia, Poland.

Career 

He represented Portugal at the European Athletics Championships both in 2016 and in 2018. In 2016, he competed in the men's half marathon and in 2018, he competed in the men's 10,000 metres event.

He represented Portugal at the 2017 Summer Universiade, held in Taipei, Taiwan, in the men's half marathon event. He did not finish his race. He finished in 5th place in the men's 10,000 metres event.

In 2021, he competed in the men's 3000 metres event at the European Athletics Indoor Championships held in Toruń, Poland.

Achievements

References

External links 
 

Living people
1993 births
Portuguese male long-distance runners
Competitors at the 2017 Summer Universiade
People from Covilhã
Sportspeople from Castelo Branco District
21st-century Portuguese people